T. gouldii may refer to:
 Tellina gouldii, Hanley, 1846, the cuneate tellin, a marine bivalve species in the genus Tellina
 Thyasira gouldii, Philippi, 1845, a bivalve species in the genus Thyasira and the family Thyasiridae

See also
 Gouldii (disambiguation)